Phyllidiopsis is a genus of sea slugs, dorid nudibranchs, shell-less marine gastropod molluscs and is the largest genus within the family Phyllidiidae.

Description
The species in this genus differ from the other genera in this family by possessing an elongate foregut and fused oral tentacles.

Distribution
These nudibranchs can be found in the tropical Indo-Pacific region, the eastern Pacific region, in the Red Sea,  in the Caribbean Sea and a few in the Northwest Atlantic Ocean. About half of the described species can be found in deep waters. Among these deep-water sea slugs, there is a group of white species, lacking all contrasting colors.

Species
There are presently about 30 species in the genus Phyllidiopsis including :

 Phyllidiopsis annae   Brunckhorst, 1993
 Phyllidiopsis anomala  Valdés, 2001 
 Phyllidiopsis bayi  (Bouchet, 1983) 
 Phyllidiopsis berghi  Vayssière, 1902 
 Phyllidiopsis blanca  Gosliner & Behrens, 1988 
 Phyllidiopsis boucheti  Valdes & Ortea, 1996 
 Phyllidiopsis brunckhorsti  Valdés, 2001 
 Phyllidiopsis burni   Brunckhorst, 1993
 Phyllidiopsis cardinalis   Bergh, 1876 : type species of the genus Phyllidiopsis
 Phyllidiopsis circularis  Valdés, 2001 
 Phyllidiopsis crucifera  Valdés, 2001 
 Phyllidiopsis dautzenbergi   (Vayssière, 1912)
 Phyllidiopsis fissurata   Brunckhorst, 1993
 Phyllidiopsis futunai Valdés, 2001
 Phyllidiopsis gemmata   Pruvot-Fol, 1957
 Phyllidiopsis holothuriana  Valdés, 2001 
 Phyllidiopsis krempfi   Pruvot-Fol, 1957
 Phyllidiopsis loricata   (Bergh, 1873)
 Phyllidiopsis lozoueti  Valdés, 2001 
 Phyllidiopsis macrotuberculata  Valdés, 2001 
 Phyllidiopsis monacha   (Yonow, 1986)
 Phyllidiopsis neocaledonica  Valdés, 2001 
 Phyllidiopsis phiphiensis   Brunckhorst, 1993
 Phyllidiopsis pipeki   Brunckhorst, 1993
 Phyllidiopsis quadrilineata (Bergh, 1905)
 Phyllidiopsis richeri Valdés, 2001
 Phyllidiopsis shireenae   Brunckhorst, 1990 
 Phyllidiopsis sinaiensis   (Yonow, 1988)
 Phyllidiopsis sphingis   Brunckhorst, 1993
 Phyllidiopsis vanuatuensis Valdés, 2001
 Phyllidiopsis xishaensis (Lin, 1983) 
Species brought into synonymy
 Phyllidiopsis carinata  Eliot, 1910 : synonym of Phyllidia ocellata Cuvier, 1804
 Phyllidiopsis fissuratus Brunckhorst, 1993: synonym of Phyllidiopsis fissurata Brunckhorst, 1993 (incorrect gender agreement of specific epithet)
 Phyllidiopsis gynenopla Bouchet, 1977: synonym of Phyllidiopsis berghi Vayssière, 1902 
 Phyllidiopsis molaensis Meyer, 1977 accepted as Phyllidiella molaensis (Meyer, 1977) (original combination)
 Phyllidiopsis papilligera Bergh, 1890: synonym of Ceratophyllidia papilligera (Bergh, 1890)
 Phyllidiopsis striata  Bergh, 1888: synonym of Phyllidiella striata (Bergh, 1890)

A maximum-parsimony analysis of the nucleotide sequence of the 16S mtDNA gene, performed in 2003, has shown that the genus Phyllidiopsis is paraphyletic.

References

Bibliography 
Bergh, L. S. R.  (1889).  Malacologische Untersuchungen.  In: Reisen im Archipel der Philippinen von Dr. Carl Gottfried Semper.  Zweiter Theil.  Wissenschaftliche Resultate.  Band 2, Theil 3, Heft 16, 2 Hälfte, pp. 815–872, pls. 82-84.; p. 859
Bergh, L. S. R.  (1890).  Report on the results of dredging, under the supervision of Alexander Agassiz, in the Gulf of Mexico (1877–1878), and in the Caribbean Sea (1879–1880), by the U.S. Coast Survey steamer “Blake”, Lieut.-Commander C. D. Sigsbee, U.S.N., and Commander J. R. Bartlett, U.S.N., commanding.  Report on the nudibranchs.  Bulletin of the Museum of Comparative Zoology, Harvard 19(3):155-181, pls. 1-3. ; p. 175
Bergh, L. S. R.  (1892).  Die Nudibranchiata holohepatica porostomata.  Verhandlungen der königlich-kaiserlich Zoologisch-botanischen Gesellschaft in Wien Abhandlungen) 42:1-16. ; p. 16
Bergh, L. S. R.  1897.  Opisthobranchiaten.  Ergebnisse einer Forschungsreise in den Molukken und Borneo, im Aufträge der Senckenbergischen naturforshenden Gesellschaft ausgeführt von Dr. Willy Kukenthal.  Abhandlungen Herausgegeben von der Senckenbergischen Naturforschenden Gesellschaft 24(1):95-130, pls. 12-13. ; p. 112
Eliot, C. N. E. (1906).  Nudibranchiata, with some remarks on the families and genera and description of a new genus, Doridomorpha, pp. 540–573, pl. 32. In: J. Stanley Gardiner (Ed.)  The fauna and geography of the Maldive and Laccadive Archipelagoes, being the account of the work carried on and of the collections made by an expedition during the years 1899 and 1900, vol. 2. ; p. 563
Marcus, Ev., & Er. Marcus.  (1962).  Opisthobranchs from Florida and the Virgin Islands.  Bulletin of Marine Science Gulf & Caribbean 12(3):450-488. ; p. 478
Pruvot-Fol, A.  (1954).  Mollusques Opisthobranches.  Faune de France, Paris 58:1-460, pl. 1; p. 329
Vayssière, A. J. B. M.  (1913).  Mollusques de la France et des régions voisines, tome premier, amphineures, gasteropodes opisthobranches, heteropodes, marseniades et oncidiides.  Encyclopedie Scientifique, publiee sous la direction du Dr. Toulouse, Bibliotheque de Zoologie Doin, Paris, pp. 1–420, I-XII, pls. 1-37.  [Nudibranchia pp. 243–365] ; p. 364
Yonow N. (2012) Opisthobranchs from the western Indian Ocean, with descriptions of two new species and ten new records (Mollusca, Gastropoda). ZooKeys 197: 1–129. [22 May 2012&#93.

Phyllidiidae
Gastropod genera